Zazdrość is a sołectwo in the west of Orzesze, Silesian Voivodeship, southern Poland. It was an independent village but as a part of gmina Gardawice was administratively merged into Orzesze in 1975. It has an area of 1.5 km2 and about 1,203 inhabitants.

History 
The village was founded in the course of the Frederician colonization after 1773 by von Kalkreuth, the owner of a nearby Zawada. 13 families settled here initially.

After World War I in the Upper Silesia plebiscite 222 out of 273 voters in Zazdrość voted in favour of joining Poland, against 50 opting for staying in Germany.

References

Neighbourhoods in Silesian Voivodeship
Mikołów County